Chalcosyrphus obscura is a species of hoverfly in the family Syrphidae.

Distribution
Carpathian Mountains.

References

Eristalinae
Insects described in 1939
Diptera of Asia
Taxa named by Zoltán Szilády